Muhammad Arfan (born 22 January 1998 in Makassar) is an Indonesian professional footballer who plays as a midfielder for Liga 1 club PSM Makassar and the Indonesia national team.

Club career

Early career
In 2010, Arfan started his football career when joined SSB Hasanudin in the 2010 Danone Nations Cup. At that time, Arfan and his team mates succeeded in bringing the champions in the regional level, which later became the representative of South Sulawesi in the national level, and ini Jakarta, they only ranked third.

PSM Makassar
He played in 2016 Indonesia Soccer Championship U-21 and then joined the senior team of PSM Makassar. Arfan made his professional debut on 16 April 2017 in a match against Persela Lamongan. On 1 November 2021, Arfan scored his first goal for PSM in the 28th minute against Persita Tangerang at the Manahan Stadium, Surakarta.

International career
He made his international debut for the U-23 team on 16 November 2017, against Syria U-23, where he came on as a substitute. Arfan made his debut for Indonesia in an unofficial friendly match in a loss to the Syria u-23 team on 18 November 2017. A week later he made his official debut on 25 November in a match against Guyana, where he came as a substitute.

Career statistics

Club

International

Honours

Club
PSM Makassar
 Piala Indonesia: 2019

International
Indonesia
 Aceh World Solidarity Cup runner-up: 2017

References

External links
 
 

1998 births
Living people
People from Makassar
Sportspeople from South Sulawesi
Indonesian footballers
PSM Makassar players
Liga 1 (Indonesia) players
Indonesia youth international footballers
Indonesia international footballers
Association football midfielders
Sportspeople from Makassar
21st-century Indonesian people